Sean FitzSimons (born September 22, 2000) is an American snowboarder who competes in the slopestyle and big air events. He represented the United States at the 2022 Winter Olympics.

Career
On January 15, 2022, FitzSimons won the men's slopestyle competition at the Laax Open with a score of 80.91 points. As a result, this boosted his U.S. ranking to fourth and international ranking to eighth and he qualified to represent the United States at the 2022 Winter Olympics.

References

2000 births
Living people
American male snowboarders
Olympic snowboarders of the United States
People from Hood River, Oregon
Snowboarders at the 2022 Winter Olympics
21st-century American people